Guinea-Bissau competed at the 2012 Summer Olympics in London, from 27 July to 12 August 2012. This was the nation's fifth consecutive appearance at the Olympics.

Four athletes from Guinea-Bissau were selected to the team, competing only in athletics and freestyle wrestling. Half of its team had competed in Beijing, including sprinter Holder da Silva and freestyle wrestler Augusto Midana; both of them advanced past the first round of their events. Midana reprised his role to be the nation's flag bearer at the opening ceremony. Guinea-Bissau won no medals at the games.

Athletics

Men

Women

Wrestling

Guinea-Bissau has qualified two quota places.

Key:
  – Victory by Fall.
  – Decision by Points – the loser with technical points.
  – Decision by Points – the loser without technical points.

Men's freestyle

Women's freestyle

See also
 Guinea-Bissau at the 2012 Summer Paralympics

References

External links
 
 

Nations at the 2012 Summer Olympics
2012
Summer Olympics